Lee Yeon (born 27 February 1995) is a South Korean actress. She is best known for her portrayal of male character Baek Seong-woo in 2022 Netflix-produced South Korean drama Juvenile Justice.

Career
Lee Yeon first made her debut as an actress in 2018 with South Korean film Anonymous. She has appeared in several films and television series, including a cameo as the younger sister of male lead Jung Hae-in's character in South Korean Netflix drama D.P. (2021), which also starred Koo Kyo-hwan as the second male lead.

Lee's breakout role comes from 2022 Netflix drama Juvenile Justice, in which Lee's character is a 13-year-old male teenager Baek Seong-woo, who was charged with murdering a young schoolboy in the drama's first two episodes. Despite being a female and her Korean age of 28 at the time she portrayed Seong-woo, Lee's acting and transformation as a cold-blooded murderer was positively reviewed and applauded by audiences and critics. Lee's performance in Juvenile Justice allowed her to gain a "Best New Actress" award nomination by the 58th Baeksang Arts Awards, but the award was eventually given to Kim Hye-jun.

Filmography

Films

Television series

Web series

Awards and nominations

References

External links

 
 

1995 births
21st-century South Korean actresses
Living_people